Bakalov or Bakalova is a patronymic surname of Bulgarian origin, also found in Russia and Ukraine. It derives from the Turkish word "bakkal", meaning "greengrocer". Notable people with this surname include:

Boris Nicola Bakalov (born 1980), Bulgarian tennis player
Dimo Bakalov (born 1988), Bulgarian football player
Igor Bakalov (1939–1992), Soviet sports shooter
Luis Bacalov (1933–2017), Argentine-born Italian film score composer of Bulgarian descent
Maria Bakalova (born 1996), Bulgarian actress 
Marin Bakalov (born 1962), Bulgarian football player and coach 
Vasily Bakalov (1929–2020), Soviet and Russian military engineer
Yuriy Bakalov (born 1966), Ukrainian football midfielder and coach

References

Bulgarian-language surnames
Slavic-language surnames
Patronymic surnames